Ravali is an Indian actress who has appeared in Telugu, Tamil, Kannada, Malayalam and Hindi Language films. She is probably best known for her performances in Subhakankshalu, Pelli Sandadi, Vinodam and Mard.

Career
In the late 1990s, offers began to reduce for Ravali in Tamil cinema. Notably, two of her ongoing projects, Kaangeyan Kaalai opposite Parthiban, and Ninaithale opposite Abbas were also abruptly stalled. During the making of Nagalingam, Ravali was not paid by the producers and she took action by reporting the case to the Nadigar Sangam, which their chief Vijayakanth helped settle.

Personal life
Ravali married Neeli Krishna on 9 May 2007 at Sarath Palace function hall, Kondapur, Hyderabad and subsequently announced her retirement from films. Her first daughter was born in May 2008 and second daughter was born in July 2018.

Partial filmography

References

External links

https://www.filmibeat.com/celebs/ravali/filmography.html

Actresses in Tamil cinema
Indian film actresses
Living people
Actresses in Kannada cinema
Actresses in Telugu cinema
People from Krishna district
Actresses from Andhra Pradesh
20th-century Indian actresses
21st-century Indian actresses
Actresses in Malayalam cinema
Year of birth missing (living people)